Erysiphe cruciferarum is a plant pathogen of the family Erysiphaceae, which causes the main powdery mildew of crucifers, including on Brassica crops, such as cauliflower, cabbage, broccoli, and Brussels sprouts. E. cruciferarum is distributed worldwide, and is of particular concentration in continental Europe and the Indian subcontinent. E. cruciferarum is an ascomycete fungus that has both sexual and asexual stages. It is also an obligate parasite that appears to have host specificity; for example, isolates from turnip will not infect Brussels sprout, and vice versa. While being a part of the family Erysiphaceae, it belongs to those members in which the conidia are formed singly and whose haustoria are multilobed.

This species is also being evaluated as a potential biological control for the invasive plant garlic mustard.

Signs and symptoms 
Erysiphe cruciferarum exhibits typical powdery mildew characteristics, appearing as small radiating, diffuse colonies of superficial white mycelium on the surface of the leaf; usually both sides of the leaf show white, powdery fungal growth. Additional signs of the pathogen would be that its conidia are singly produced (not in chains) and are ovoid to cylindrical in shape, ranging from 42.5–57 µm × 14.5–20.5 µm in size. Also, E. cruciferarum has rather variable appressoria, differing from lobed to simple, and haustoria that are multilobed. Severe, advanced infections produce a dense white powdery covering of leaves, stems, and seed crop pods. On cauliflower and cabbage, heavily diseased plants show chlorosis, early defoliation, and necrosis of the tips of young leaves. Colonies may be gray and restricted in size on resistant cultivars as the host reaction produces black speckling beneath the colony. On Brussels sprout, gray or purple symptoms occur on the stems, while on the sprouts there may be white colonies or fine black speckling in radiating lines.

Disease diagnosis is determined on the basis of anamorph morphology and host.

Disease cycle 
Erysiphe cruciferarum is an obligate parasite. They overwinter as resting spores on plant tissues or in the soil. These resting spores are called Chasmothecia. Chasmothecium are signature of all powdery mildews and can be identified by their appendages. When the environment is favorable——the chasmothecia will release asci which contain ascospores. Ascospores are the sexual spore of the powdery mildew. They are dispersed primarily by wind and germinate on the surface of plant tissue. They infect and feed on the plant via haustoria. Secondary infection is caused by the production and dispersal of conidia (asexual spores). Chasmothecium are then produced on vegetative surface of host in late summer.

Environment 
Erysiphe cruciferarum produces well when it is in moderate to high humidity with moderate temperatures. Temperatures between 70–80 °F (22–27 °C) with low relative humidity during the day and high relative humidity at night are favorable ranges. This pathogen has a wide host range. It can infect many wild plants along with cash crops. It has the ability to jump from field weeds to cultivated crops within a single season if the conditions are right. It will reduce photosynthesis and affect yields on cultivated crops. With that, this pathogen can be very troublesome in a greenhouse and protected environment, as these spaces provide ideal growing conditions. Protected growing environments tend to have temperatures and humidity within the pathogen's desired range to reproduce. Wind and rain can also spread the spores of E. cruciferarum. Adding vegetative wind barriers can impede the spores' travel into the cultivated field and possibly lower the chance of infection. High planting densities will decrease the distance and time needed to travel to a new healthy host. Lowering the planting density or adding space between rows can aid in slowing the spores' spread.

Management 
BiologicalAQ10 is a hyperparasite of powdery mildew. It is a fungus, Ampelomyces quisqualis, and should be applied preventatively. 
CulturalIf resistant varieties are available, they should be used. Other "volunteer" host plants in the area should be eliminated and infected debris should be cleared whenever possible. Crops should be rotated with non-crucifer crops.
ChemicalOils like neem or jojoba can be sprayed on surface of plant to help with mild-moderate mildew infections. Fungicides like azoxystrobin and sulfur can be used to prevent an infection or kill an existing infection.

Importance 
Erysiphe cruciferarum is currently being studied for its ability to be used as a biological control to curtail garlic mustards whose growth is widely unchecked across the country. E. cruciferarum could provide an effective way to control garlic mustard without human intervention. E. cruciferarum has the ability to reduce the vitality and vigor of host plants by lowering the efficiency of photosynthesis, which in turn will lower the plant's ability to produce seed and survive another generation. This pathogen is somewhat host-specific in that it targets plants in the genus Brassica. This pathogen can also infect Brassica crops so it must be used with caution or must be engineered to only attack garlic mustard.

Pathogenesis 
Erysiphe cruciferarum is a fungal pathogen that belongs to the phylum Ascomycota. The pathogen overwinters in survival structures known as ascospores. The powdery mildew initially appears as white, powdery spots formed on leaf surfaces, shoots, and sometimes flowers or fruits. Over time, the spots spread over a larger area of leaves and stems. Eventually, leaves infected with powdery mildew may turn yellow in color and proceed to die or fall off. In some cases, fungal growth causes leaves to twist or distort in shape. Specifically, powdery mildew functions by decreasing the fruit production of plants. The ascospores survive on leaf material and cause it to fall onto the ground. Certain biological fungicides, such as Serenade or sulfur products, can be used on plants to inhibit powdery mildew infection.

References 

Fungal plant pathogens and diseases
Vegetable diseases
cruciferaum
Fungi described in 1967